Thomas & Friends: King of the Railway is a 2013 British computer-animated fantasy comedy adventure film and feature-length special of the British television series, Thomas & Friends. The film is produced by HIT Entertainment and animated by Arc Productions, replacing Nitrogen Studios. It is the series’ first production to have CGI animation provided by Arc Productions.

Directed by Rob Silvestri and written by Andrew Brenner with additional material by Sam Wilkinson, the film stars Ben Small and Martin Sherman as Thomas the Tank Engine in the US and the UK respectively. Co-stars include Keith Wickham, Kerry Shale, William Hope and Teresa Gallagher.

Bob Golding, Mike Grady, Jonathan Forbes, Rebecca O'Mara and Miranda Raison join the cast.
It Originally Aired on KCTS9 on November 28, 2013 to December 25, 2013.

Plot
Long ago, Sodor was a kingdom under the rule of King Godred. One day Godred’s crown was stolen by thieves. Though the thieves were caught, the crown was hidden and considered lost forever.

In the present day, Sir Topham Hatt announces to the engines that Sir Robert Norramby, the Earl of Sodor is returning from his travels around the world for many years. Sir Robert wishes to restore the ruins of King Godred’s Castle at Ulfstead.

Thomas arrives at Ulfstead with crates of building materials, where he meets a French narrow gauge engine named Millie. Thomas remarks that he hasn't seen her before to which she responds, explaining that she was kept in her shed when the Earl was on his travels around the world.

Spencer returns to the island and stays at Tidmouth Sheds for the night, where he argues with Gordon about who is the fastest. The two engines race the next day but Spencer abruptly leaves in between the race, claiming that he has to help the Earl.

After Henry has a fault with his bursted safety valve, Thomas, Percy and James are assigned to pull his heavy goods train to the castle. Once there, Thomas meets Jack the Front Loader who informs him of The Earl's plans to restore the castle. The Earl tells Thomas that one of the flatbeds (containing a crate on top) should have been taken to the Steamworks. Out of curiosity, Percy and James follow Thomas as he transports the flatbed.

When the engines arrive at the Steamworks, the crate is removed from the flatbed to reveal an old and rusty engine: Stephenson's Rocket, referred to as Stephen. The engines ask the Earl why Stephen has been brought to Sodor. The Earl claims that he has a “special job” for him but asks the engines not to tell him that. That night at Tidmouth Sheds, Thomas, Percy and James told the other engines about Stephen.

The next morning, all the other engines visit the Steamworks to have a look at Stephen. Stephen explains that he is one of the first steam engines ever built in the world. Back when he was built, engines were typically pulled by horses and steam engines were new and experimental. He was contested in a race against the other existing steam engines at the time, which he won.

After a while, Stephen is restored and repainted. Sir Topham Hatt informs Thomas, Percy and James of a new job at Ulfstead. On hearing this, Stephen feels disheartened at not having a job of his own, thinking that the newer engines are more useful than him. Thomas tries to cheer him up by telling him about the Earl's special job for him.

As expected, Stephen gets very excited and starts searching Sodor to find out what his new job is. First, he visits Brendam Docks, then the Blue Mountain Quarry and finally decides to visit a old, abandoned mine that is located downhill at Ulfstead.

Uphill of the mine, Thomas, Percy and James are still helping rebuild the castle when the Earl tells them that the castle will be opened to the public as a tourist attraction and that Stephen's special job is to be their tour guide.

Meanwhile, Gordon and Spencer try having another race after their previous attempt failed. They are passed by two speedy streamlined tender engines, who introduce themselves as Connor and Caitlin, who have come to Sodor to take passengers to the castle from the Mainland.

Stephen reaches the mine but is disappointed to see that the entrance to the mine is blocked. He begins to think that Thomas was wrong about him having a job.

Thomas and Percy get ready to push some Troublesome Trucks containing dirt away, but the Earl says that the train would be too heavy for them and that they should wait for James to return from having a wash. Thomas does not want to wait, instead he wants to tell Stephen about his job. He insists that they can take the train themselves.

When Thomas and Percy climb up the slope, they realize that there should be an engine in the front to control the trucks. However it's too late and the trucks push themselves downhill. The trucks collide with Stephen and cause the entrance of the mine to open, sending Stephen inside and causing his funnel to fall off. The impact causes a shower of rocks to block the entrance of the mine once again - this time with Stephen stuck inside. Thomas and Percy, who were at the back of the train, did not see this.

Thomas visits the Steamworks, unaware that Stephen left, to tell him about his special job. He is shocked on finding that he isn't there and the engines begin searching for him.

Inside the mine, Stephen tries finding his own way out. He eventually finds an old wooden chest, which he tries bumping out of the way. The chest tumbles over and opens up. Stephen is amazed by what he finds. By the next day, he is still looking for a way out when he finds himself in the same place he started.

While the engines are searching for Stephen, Thomas reaches the entrance of the mine. At first he thinks that Stephen wouldn't be inside but notices his funnel lying on the ground. Thomas shouts Stephen's name, who whistles in response.

Thomas brings Jack the Front Loader to the mine, who clears the fallen rocks. With the entrance now unblocked, Thomas finds Stephen and pulls him out of the mine to safety.

The next day was the grand reopening of Ulfstead Castle and the Earl declares while delivering a speech that Stephen found King Godred's golden crown while inside the mine.

As Stephen and Millie give tours of the castle, Connor, Caitlin, Spencer and Gordon all have a race.

According to concept art, Colin was originally meant to appear in this special, based at Ulfstead Castle. The concept art was done by Guru Studios rather than Arc Productions, which is likely the reason why Colin's role was cut.

Voice cast

References

External links

2010s British animated films
2010s children's animated films
2013 computer-animated films
2013 films
British computer-animated films
Films set in Cumbria
Films set on islands
Lionsgate animated films
Mattel Creations films
Thomas & Friends
2010s English-language films
2010s American films
2010s British films